Pentti Haanpää (October 14, 1905 – September 30, 1955) was a Finnish author. He was born in Pulkkila, and is best known for his books Vääpeli Sadon tapaus 1935 and Noitaympyrä 1931. He died in Pyhäntä, aged 49.

Bibliography
 Maantietä pitkin 1925, Swedish version: Hemfolk och strykare
 Tuuli käy heidän ylitseen 1927
 Kenttä ja kasarmi 1928
 Noitaympyrä 1931/1956
 Vääpeli Sadon tapaus 1935/1956
 Isännät ja isäntien varjot 1935
 Taivalvaaran näyttelijä 1938
 Ihmiselon karvas ihanuus 1939
 Korpisotaa 1940, French version: Guerre dans le Désert Blanc
 Nykyaikaa 1942
 Yhdeksän miehen saappaat 1945
 Jutut 1946/1952
 Jauhot 1949
 Kiinalaiset jutut 1954

External links
 

1905 births
1955 deaths
People from Siikalatva
Writers from Northern Ostrobothnia
Finnish male short story writers
Finnish short story writers
Finnish-language writers
20th-century Finnish novelists
20th-century short story writers
20th-century male writers